Christopher Kemper Ober (born November 1, 1954) is an American/Canadian materials scientist and engineer. , he is Francis Norwood Bard Professor of Materials Engineering at Cornell University, Ithaca, NY, Cornell University and Director of the Cornell NanoScale Science and Technology Facility. Among other posts at Cornell, he has served as Interim Dean of Engineering (January 2009-July 2010) and Director of the Department of Materials Science & Engineering in the Cornell University College of Engineering (January 2000-December 2003). Prior to joining Cornell University, he was a researcher at the Xerox Research Centre of Canada.

Ober was awarded a B.Sc. degree in 1978 by the University of Waterloo (Waterloo, Ontario, Canada), with a major in Honors Chemistry (Co-Operative Program). He received his M.S. (1980) and Ph.D. (1982) degrees in Polymer Science & Engineering from the University of Massachusetts (Amherst).

Ober was elected to the National Academy of Engineering in 2023. He is an Elected Fellow of the American Association for the Advancement of Science, a Fellow of the American Physical Society,a Fellow of the American Chemical Society and an Elected Member of the Executive Committee of the International Union of Pure and Applied Chemistry. He serves on the editorial boards of Polymer Bulletin, Polymers for Advanced Technologies, and Green Materials. From 1995 to 2010 he was an associate editor of Macromolecules. He has directed more than 45 Cornell Ph.D. dissertations, has co-authored or co-edited eight books or reports, has co-authored more than 400 refereed articles, and shares more than 40 patents.

Ober's research interests center in the synthesis, processing, and characterization of functional polymers with tailored nano- and molecular architectures for targeted properties. Detailed evaluation of polymer behavior for the design of superior macromolecular materials includes synchrotron-based characterization. Synthetic tools include living polymerization methods such as anionic, ATRP and living radical polymerization. Of special interest are systems that undergo "bottom-up" self-organization/assembly, including liquid crystalline polymers and block copolymers as well as "top down" lithographic materials. Environmentally and biologically friendly materials are now a major focus of research.

References

Living people
Fellows of the American Association for the Advancement of Science
Fellows of the American Physical Society
Cornell University faculty
American materials scientists
21st-century American engineers
1954 births
Canadian materials scientists